Randolph Brook is a tributary of the Millstone River in northern Franklin Park, New Jersey, United States.

Course

See also
List of rivers of New Jersey

References

External links
USGS Coordinates in Google Maps

Rivers of Somerset County, New Jersey
Rivers of New Jersey
Tributaries of the Raritan River